The following is a sortable table of the most populous county in each U.S. state, federal district, and territory.  Counties and states/territories in bold have a population of at least 1 million.



Table

Notes

References

External links

Populous
Counties by U.S. state, Most populous
Counties by state